North Chotanagpur division is one of the five divisions in the Indian state of Jharkhand.

The division comprises the following districts: Bokaro, Chatra, Dhanbad, Giridih, Hazaribagh, Koderma and Ramgarh. It was earlier part of the Chota Nagpur Division. It has a population of 11,635,374.

Languages

References

Divisions of Jharkhand